Maksim Kuznetsov may refer to:

 Maxim Kuznetsov (born 1977), Kazakhstani former ice hockey player
 Maksim Kuznetsov (swimmer) (born 1982), Russian former swimmer